Jovan Anđelković (Serbian Cyrillic: Joвaн Aнђeлкoвић) (14 August 1942 – 27 April 1969) was a Serbian football midfielder. He was capped twice for the Yugoslav national team.

After starting to play with his hometown club FK Radnički Pirot in the Second League, he moved in 1962 to Red Star Belgrade, but after one season, he will move to another Yugoslav First League club, FK Radnički Niš. In 1968, while his career was in full strength, he got ill and died from a lung cancer.

External sources
 Career story at Reprezentacija.rs.

1942 births
1969 deaths
People from Pirot
Serbian footballers
Yugoslav footballers
Yugoslavia international footballers
Red Star Belgrade footballers
FK Radnički Niš players
Association football midfielders
Deaths from lung cancer in Yugoslavia